The 2015–16 East Superleague (known as the McBookie.com East Superleague for sponsorship reasons) was the 14th season of the East Superleague, the top tier of league competition for SJFA East Region member clubs.

The season began on 8 August 2015 and ended on 4 June 2016. Kelty Hearts were the reigning champions.

Bonnyrigg Rose Athletic secured the title on 18 May 2016, their third East Superleague championship. As winners they entered the preliminary round of the 2016–17 Scottish Cup.

Teams
The following teams changed division prior to the 2015–16 season.

To East Superleague
Promoted from East Premier League
Tayport
St Andrews United
Broughty Athletic

From East Superleague
Relegated to East Premier League
Armadale Thistle
Lochee United

Folded
Ballingry Rovers

Stadia and locations

Managerial changes

League table

Results

East Region Super/Premier League play-off
Lochee United, who finished third in the East Premier League, defeated Sauchie Juniors 10–0 on aggregate in the East Region Super/Premier League play-off to gain promotion.

References

6
East Superleague seasons